Susannah Buckler, also known as Mrs. Matthews, was a convicted thief and prostitute from Dublin, Ireland. who was involved in a bloody convict mutiny aboard the brigantine Baltimore bound for Annapolis, Maryland. She is notorious for her escape from authorities in Nova Scotia following the mutiny.

Her Notoriety
On May 9, 1736, Susannah Buckler arrived at Annapolis Royal accompanied by two men; Mr. Charles D'Entremont (a Pubnico man who found her), and Mr. George Mitchell (a surveyor for the Crown). She was taken to Lt. Gov. Lawrence Armstrong, where she told her tale of woe. She was the wife of shipowner and merchant Andrew Buckler on the brigantine Baltimore. Baltimore left Dublin, Ireland on October 7, 1735 to sail to Annapolis, Maryland. According to Mrs. Buckler, on December 15, 1735, they were off-routed by bad weather and accidentally washed up into Tibogue harbour, near Cape Sable off the coast of Nova Scotia. For lack of fresh water, the crew perished except Mrs. Buckler and two sailors. She had left the sailors alive when she was robbed (along with the £12,000 sterling cargo aboard the ship) and kidnapped by the Mi'kmaq on April 4, 1736. She was later found by Mr. D'Entremont and taken to Annapolis Royal.

Armstrong believed her story and sent Ensn. Charles Vane to search for the abandoned ship. In the meantime, Armstrong sent Mrs. Buckler to Boston with money and letters of introduction to Boston Governor J. Belcher. A few weeks after he had sent Mrs. Buckler to Boston, Armstrong received a letter from Barbados of a woman inquiring of the fate of her husband, Andrew Buckler, of the ship Baltimore. The letter was from the real Susannah Buckler, and sent Armstrong into a furious hunt for the mystery woman who had duped him.

It was later found that Baltimore had actually been carrying a cargo of 60-70 convicts from Ireland being transported to Maryland. It is thought that the convicts rose against and slaughtered the owner Andrew Buckler, the captain Richard White, and the crew. Without navigation skills, and fear of being known in larger ports, the mutinous convicts harboured in a quiet bay where they all ran off or perished except Susannah Buckler. She was later discovered as Mrs. Matthews, a convicted thief and prostitute from Dublin who won her name in a fight for an executed man, Mr. Matthews. Whether she was indeed Mr. Matthews' wife is unknown. Some of the mutineers from Baltimore were caught and tried in Salem, Massachusetts, but Mrs. Matthews was never seen again. It is believed that she returned to Ireland.

References

Conlin, D.(2009)Pirates of the Atlantic: Robbery, Murder and Mayhem off the Canadian East Coast. Halifax: Formac Publishing Company Ltd.

External links
Letter from L. Armstrong to The Council of Trade and Plantations, June 19, 1736. Retrieved from http://www.british-history.ac.uk/report.aspx?compid=72846
Letter from L. Armstrong to the Council of Trade and Plantations, November 23, 1736. Retrieved from http://www.british-history.ac.uk/report.aspx?compid=72856
Marine Heritage Database: Baltimore 1735. Retrieved from https://novascotia.ca/museum/wrecks/wrecks/shipwrecks.asp?ID=541

British mutineers
Irish female prostitutes
Year of birth unknown
Year of death unknown
British people convicted of theft